Harpalus griseus is a species of ground beetle in the subfamily Harpalinae. It was described by Panzer in 1796.

References

griseus
Beetles described in 1796